Yangpyeong FC is a South Korean football club based in the county of Yangpyeong in Gyeonggi Province. The club is a member of the K3 League, a semi-professional league and the third tier of league football in South Korea, since the 2023 season.

History
Yangpyeong FC founded in 2015.

Yangpyeong FC promoted to K3 League in 2022 from next season.

Current squad

Honours

Season by season records

See also
 List of football clubs in South Korea

References

External links
 Yangpyeong FC official website 

K3 League clubs
Sport in Gyeonggi Province
Yangpyeong County
Association football clubs established in 2015
2015 establishments in South Korea